James Kombo Moyana (4 July 1942 – 19 January 2021) was the Governor of the Reserve Bank of Zimbabwe from 1983 to 1993.

Moyana, who became the first black Governor upon his appointment, was originally placed in that position by the then Prime Minister of Zimbabwe, Robert Mugabe.

Moyana died from COVID-19 in January 2021, during the COVID-19 pandemic in Zimbabwe.

References

1942 births
2021 deaths
Governors of the Reserve Bank of Zimbabwe
Deaths from the COVID-19 pandemic in Zimbabwe